Jesus Ibarra (born November 10, 1997) is an American soccer player who plays as a forward.

Career

Charleston Battery
In February 2020, Ibarra joined USL Championship club Charleston Battery, the club's fourth signing prior to the 2020 USL Championship season. He made his league debut for the club on July 19, 2020 against the Birmingham Legion.

Greenville Triumph
In April 2021, Ibarra joined USL League One side Greenville Triumph SC ahead of the 2021 season. Ibarra signed a new contract with Triumph SC in January 2022.

References

External links
Profile with Wilmington Hammerheads

1997 births
Living people
Bodens BK players
Charleston Battery players
Greenville Triumph SC players
USL League Two players
National Premier Soccer League players
Ettan Fotboll players
USL Championship players
American soccer players
Association football forwards
American expatriates
American expatriate soccer players
American expatriate sportspeople in Sweden
Expatriate footballers in Sweden
Soccer players from San Diego